La Giralda may refer to:

La Giralda (San Juan, Puerto Rico), listed on the U.S. National Register of Historic Places
Alimentos La Giralda, a food company
Giralda, the bell tower of the Cathedral of Seville, in Seville, Spain
Giralda (Kansas City), a tower in Kansas City, Missouri, USA
 La Giralda, a building in Carmel-by-the-Sea, California, USA